Long Island is a densely populated island in the southeastern geographical area of the State of New York.

Long Island may also refer to:

Antarctica 
 Long Island (Antarctica)

Antigua and Barbuda 
 Long Island, Antigua

Australia 
 Long Island (New South Wales), an island in the Hawkesbury River north of Sydney, New South Wales
 Long Island (Broad Sound Islands), Queensland
 Long Island (Whitsunday Islands), Queensland
 Long Island (Tasmania), an island in eastern Bass Strait
 Long Islet (Tasmania), an islet in northern Bass Strait
 Long Island (Western Australia), an island in King Sound, Kimberley region
 Long Island, an island in the River Murray in South Australia
Long Island Recreation Park, South Australia

Bahamas 
 Long Island, Bahamas, an island and a district of the Bahamas

Bermuda
 Long Island, Bermuda

British Indian Ocean Territory
 Ile Longue (Peros Banhos) (Long Island), an island in the Chagos Archipelago

Canada 
 Long Island (British Columbia), on Harrison Lake
 Long Island (Frobisher Bay, Nunavut), off the coast of Baffin Island
 Long Island (Gull Lake), near Gravenhurst, Ontario
 Long Island (Hermitage Bay, Newfoundland)
 Long Island (Hudson Bay, Nunavut), off the coast of Quebec
 Long Island (Kings County), in the Kennebecasis River near Rothesay, New Brunswick
 Long Island (Nova Scotia)
 Long Island (Placentia Bay, Newfoundland and Labrador)
 Long Island, in Rice Lake (Ontario)
 Long Island, in the Rideau River, Ontario

Croatia 
 Dugi Otok (Long Island), in the Adriatic Sea

Falkland Islands 
 Bleaker Island, also called Long Island

Greece 
 Makronisos (Long Island), in the Aegean Sea

India 
 Long Island, Andaman, an island and county in the Andaman Archipelago

Ireland 
 Long Island, County Cork

Jamaica 
 Long Island, an island in Jamaica

Namibia 
 North Long Island and South Long Island, two islands of the Penguin Islands

New Zealand 
 Long Island, Marlborough
 Long Island, Southland

Papua New Guinea 
 Long Island (Papua New Guinea)

Seychelles 
 Long Island, Seychelles

Sri Lanka 
 Long Island, Sri Lanka

United Kingdom 
 Long Island (Dorset), Poole Harbour, Dorset, England
 Long Island (Hampshire), England
 Outer Hebrides, sometimes referred to as "The Long Island" in Scotland
 Long Island, County Down, a townland in County Down, Northern Ireland
 Long Island, County Fermanagh, a townland in County Fermanagh, Northern Ireland

United States 
 Long Island, Alabama, a community
 Long Island (Alaska), an island in the Alexander Archipelago
 Long Island (California), an island in the Sacramento–San Joaquin River Delta
 Long Island (Connecticut), an island in the Housatonic River
 Long Island, Florida, a barrier island
 Long Island, Kansas, a city in Phillips County
 Long Island, Maine, a town and island in Cumberland County
 Long Island (Maryland), an island in Chesapeake Bay
 Long Island (Cecil County, Maryland), an island in Maryland
 Long Island (Massachusetts), the longest island in Boston Harbor
 Long Island, the largest island in New Hampshire, located on Lake Winnipesaukee
 Long Island, New York, an island and geographical area of New York State
 Long Island AVA, New York wine region
 Long Island City, an area of Queens County, New York
 Long Island (proposed state), various proposals for a new US state on the island
 Long Island, North Carolina, a community
 Long Island Beach, a former amusement park in Whitewater Township, Hamilton County, Ohio
 Isle of Palms, South Carolina, formerly known as Long Island
 Long Island (Tennessee), an island on the Holston River
 Long Island, Virginia, a town in Campbell County
 Long Island (Washington), in Willapa Bay
 Long Island (Wisconsin), one of the Apostle Islands in Lake Superior

Other uses
 Long Island iced tea, an alcoholic mixed drink
 USS Long Island, the name of two United States Navy ships

See also
 Long Island Ducks (disambiguation)
 Long Island Military Reservation (disambiguation)
 Long Island Railroad (disambiguation)
 
 Long Bay (disambiguation)
 Île Longue (French for "Long Island")
 Lang Island, Indonesia
 Lon Gisland, an EP by Beirut